Solomon River is a waterway in the U.S. state of Alaska, near Nome.

Geography
The placer mines of the region are accessible from the settlements of Solomon and Dickson, at the mouth of the river. Dickson is the terminus of the Council City and Solomon River Railroad. Solomon River discharges into the inlet of Port Safety Lagoon. Its gradient here probably does not exceed  to the mile. Above the coastal plain, the river occupies a comparatively broad valley and the gradient increases to at least  to the mile.

History
The river was named by Pierce Thomas, who staked Discovery claim in June, 1899. In the same season, the river and its tributaries were prospected, and in 1900 probably $10,000 worth of gold was mined in this district. The successful operation of a large dredge on Solomon River in 1905 furnished the final proof that dredges were to play an important part in the mining industry of Seward Peninsula; other dredges had been tried with more or less success, but this was the first to be operated in a large way.

Tributaries
Its more important tributaries, Shovel Creek, Big Hurrah Creek, East Fork, and Coal Creek, enter at right angles and flow approximately east or west. Nugget Creek, a tributary of Solomon River, contained no trace of either gold or silver. Jerome and Manila creeks are two short western tributaries of Solomon River within a few miles of the coast, heading within the coastal plain. Shovel Creek flows into Solomon River from the west about 4 miles from the coast; mining operations in the Shovel Creek basin were confined to three small tributaries—Mystery, West, and Kasson creeks. 
 Nugget Creek
 Jerome Creek
 Manila Creek
 Shovel Creek
 Mystery Creek
 West Creek
 Kasson Creek
 Big Hurrah Creek
 Little Hurrah Creek
 Coal Creek 
 Penny Creek
 Lion Creek

References

External links

Rivers of the Seward Peninsula
Rivers of Alaska
Rivers of Nome Census Area, Alaska
Rivers of Unorganized Borough, Alaska